Tramontana, Tramontane, or Tramuntana may refer to:

Tramontana
 "Tramontana", a short story by Gabriel García Márquez, in Strange Pilgrims
 Tramontana (sports car), a Spanish sports car firm
 Sebi Tramontana (born 1960), jazz trombonist most often associated with avant-garde jazz and free improvisation music
 Spanish submarine Tramontana, Submarine S74 Tramontana of the Spanish Navy

Tramontane
 Tramontane, a northern wind (tramontana in Italian and tramuntana in Catalan)
 "Tramontane", an instrumental by the rock group Foreigner, from their album Double Vision (Foreigner album); served as the "B" side to their single "Hot Blooded"
 Tramontane (film), a 2016 Lebanese drama film
 The Pole star, a visible star
 Tramontane, a science fiction novel by Emil Petaja

Tramuntana
 Serra de Tramuntana, a small mountain chain in Majorca
 35725 Tramuntana, the name of an asteroid

es:Tramuntana (desambiguación)
it:Tramontana
pl:Tramontana
sl:Tramontana